Wellington Park Football Club is a former Irish football club from Belfast. It was founded in 1882 by members of Rugby Lacrosse Club. It reached the final of the Irish Cup in 1884, losing to Distillery. The club wound up at the end of the 1886-87 season and was reformed as Rugby Football Club, now playing rugby union. Rugby F.C. in turn folded in 1890 and some of its former members helped form Collegians rugby club, while others formed the Windsor rugby club.

References

Association football clubs established in 1882
Association football clubs disestablished in 1887
Defunct association football clubs in Northern Ireland
Association football clubs in Belfast
1882 establishments in Ireland
1887 disestablishments in Ireland